Mavur Dam is a masonry gravity dam located on Dindigul district in the Indian state of Tamil Nadu. Sirumalai hill is the prime catchment of the dam.

References

Gravity dams
Dindigul district